Guillerval is a railway station 3 km west of Guillerval, Île de France, France. The station is on the Paris–Bordeaux railway line. The station is served by regional trains (TER Centre-Val de Loire) to Orléans, Étampes and Paris.

References

External links
 

Railway stations in Essonne
TER Centre-Val de Loire
Railway stations in France opened in 1843